Isabelle Ledoux-Rak (born 1957) is a French physicist and Professor at the École Normale Supérieure Paris-Saclay, where she is director of the Quantum and Molecular Photonics Laboratory (LPQM - UMR CNRS 8537) and coordinator of the Erasmus Mundus Master's degree. Her research interests focus on the study of the non-linear optical properties of molecules and nanomaterials.

Education 

Ledoux-Rak studied chemistry and physical sciences at the École normale supérieure de jeunes filles, and joined the Ecole Nationale Superieure des Telecommunications to study engineering in 1981. She obtained a Ph.D. in physics from the Centre National d'Études des Télécommunications (CNET) at Bagneux in 1988, under the supervision of Joseph Zyss. Her thesis studied the non-linear optical properties of organic molecules and was distinguished with the Prize of the Physical Chemistry Division of the French Society of Chemistry.

Research and career 
Ledoux-Rak continued her postdoctoral research in non-linear optics at CNET until joining the École Normale Supérieure (ENS) Paris-Saclay (formerly Cachan) in 1998, where she was involved with founding the Quantum and Molecular Photonics Laboratory (LPQM) with her former supervisor, Joseph Zyss.

She has been a Professor of physics at ENS Paris-Saclay since 2002, and director of the LPQM since 2006.

Awards and honours 
In 2015, Ledoux-Rak was awarded the Fernand Holweck Medal and Prize for her research on the non-linear optical properties of metal complexes and the detection of optical amplification phenomena at telecom wavelengths in polymer-based waveguides. She and Zyss also jointly received the Yves Rocard Prize of the French Physical Society for instrumentation in 1996.

References

External links 

 

French women physicists
1957 births
Living people
Women in optics
Optical physicists
20th-century French physicists
21st-century French physicists
French women academics
20th-century French women
Academic staff of the École Normale Supérieure